Senda Farah Chekir (born 19 July 1992) is a Tunisian handball player for Megrine Sport HBF and the Tunisian national team.

She participated at the 2017 World Women's Handball Championship.

References

1992 births
Living people
Tunisian female handball players